Rodney Darien Theophile Cuthbert (born September 16, 1999) is a Nicaraguan professional baseball pitcher in the Washington Nationals organization.

Career
Theophile grew up on the Mosquito Coast of Nicaragua, in the town of Pearl Lagoon. He began playing baseball at age 12. Originally a first baseman, Theophile was discovered by professional baseball scout Alex Mongrío, who recognized his potential as a pitcher. In 2015, Theophile traveled to the Dominican Republic to train at the MVP Rivera Sport Academy. He participated in an international showcase for Major League Baseball organizations in early 2016 in the Dominican Republic—the only Nicaraguan prospect at that showcase, El Nuevo Diario reported at the time. While training in the Dominican Republic, Theophile sharpened his curveball and improved the velocity of his fastball to top out above .

The San Francisco Giants expressed interest in Theophile, reportedly signing him as an international amateur free agent in 2017, shortly after Theophile's 18th birthday. However, the deal was never finalized and ultimately fell through. Theophile, an admirer of Washington Nationals pitcher Max Scherzer, subsequently signed with Washington for a $20,000 bonus.

Theophile made his professional debut with the Nationals' Gulf Coast League affiliate in July 2018. Theophile underwent Tommy John surgery and missed the 2019 season, and the 2020 season was canceled due to the COVID-19 pandemic. In 2021, Theophile was assigned to begin the season with the Low-A Fredericksburg Nationals. In 2022, he pitched for Fredericksburg and the High-A Wilmington Blue Rocks.

Personal life
Theophile is a cousin of infielder Cheslor Cuthbert on his mother's side. His parents separated when he was 8 years old. His father instilled in him an interest in baseball, taking him to games when he was a boy, while his mother, a former member of the Nicaragua women's national basketball team, preferred that he take up basketball instead. Theophile's father died of a heart attack in 2016, at age 39, while Theophile was abroad for training in Panama and the Dominican Republic.

References

External links

Living people
1999 births
Nicaraguan baseball players
Gulf Coast Nationals players
Fredericksburg Nationals players
Wilmington Blue Rocks players
2023 World Baseball Classic players